Adelogyrinus is an extinct genus of prehistoric amphibian, fossils of which were found in the Dunnet Shale of Scotland.

See also 
 List of prehistoric amphibians

References 

Adelospondyls
Paleozoic amphibians of Europe
Carboniferous Scotland
Fossils of Scotland
Fossil taxa described in 1928
Taxa named by D. M. S. Watson